Argenis Chávez Frías (born 3 July 1958) is a Venezuelan politician who currently serves as Governor of Barinas state since 2017. He is one of the brothers of the former Venezuelan president, Hugo Chávez.

He was secretary of the Barinas state government when his father, Hugo de los Reyes Chávez, was the governor from 1998 to 2008. In 2011, he was appointed Vice Minister of Electrical Development of the Ministry of Popular Power for Electric Power.

Sanctions 
In November 2017, Canada sanctioned Chávez and other Venezuelan officials under the Justice for Victims of Corrupt Foreign Officials Act, stating: "These individuals are responsible for, or complicit in, gross violations of internationally recognized human rights, have committed acts of significant corruption, or both."

References

External links
 Spiegel on Chávez family

1958 births
Governors of Barinas (state)
People from Barinas (state)
Chávez family
United Socialist Party of Venezuela politicians
Venezuelan socialists
People of the Crisis in Venezuela
Living people